As Sayliyah Army Base (Arabic:قاعدة السيلية العسكرية) or Camp As Sayliyah was a United States Army base in Al Sailiya, a suburb outside Doha, Qatar. U.S. Central Command used it to preposition material bound for Iraq and Afghanistan. It was the largest U.S. Army prepositioning site in the world, capable of storing enough equipment for a U.S. Army armored brigade: more than 150 M-1 Abrams tanks, 116 Bradley fighting vehicles, and 112 other armored personnel carriers. It was established in 2000, and closed in June 2021 when its mission was moved to Area Support Group-Jordan. In 2022, it is being used as a way station or "lily pad" for housing Afghans who have been evacuated by the US Government.

References

External links
Pike, John. "Camp As Sayliyah." globalsecurity.org, 2000–2008.

Military installations of the United States in Qatar